Ivan Kozoriz (born 14 September 1979) is a professional Ukrainian football defender. He moved to Kharkiv in the 2008 summer transfer season from FC Zakarpattia Uzhhorod.

External links 

Official Website Profile

1979 births
Living people
Footballers from Kyiv
Ukraine student international footballers
Ukrainian footballers
SC Tavriya Simferopol players
FC Hoverla Uzhhorod players
FC Kharkiv players
FC Mariupol players
FC Spartak Sumy players
FC Prykarpattia Ivano-Frankivsk (2004) players
FC Naftovyk-Ukrnafta Okhtyrka players
FC Poltava players
Ukrainian Premier League players
Ukrainian First League players
Ukrainian Second League players
Association football defenders